Rabbi Elazar ben Moshe Azikri (1533–1600) was a Jewish kabbalist, poet and writer.

Biography
Azikri was born in Safed to a Sephardic family who had settled in Ottoman Syria after the expulsion from Spain.
He studied Torah under Rabbi Yosef Sagis, Rabbi Jacob Berab, and in the Yeshiva of Moshe Cordovero. 

He is counted with the greatest Rabbis and intellectuals of his time: Shlomo Halevi Alkabetz, Yosef Karo, Moshe Cordovero, Isaac Luria, Israel Najara, etc.
In fact, he was one of a handful of rabbis to receive the renewed rabbinic semichah initiated by Rabbi Berab.

In 1588 Rabbi Elazar founded the "Sukat Shalom" movement who acted to arouse in Jews the devotion to religion. His Sefer Haredim - see below -  blends a halachic enumeration of the Mitzvos (Torah "commandments") with Kabbalist ethics, and is one of the central works of it genre.

Rabbi Elazar died in 1600 and was buried in Safed.

Works
It was printed after his death in 1600. Its arrangement differs from other similar books:  First, the mitzvos are arranged according to the human body and / or the time on which they depend in their observance; Second, the work does not maintain a single count of the mitzvos, but rather lists these re the opinion of several Rishonim, authorities to c. 1600.  

He also wrote a commentary on Tractate Bezah and Berachot of the Jerusalem Talmud.

The Piyyut (liturgical poem) Yedid Nefesh (ידיד נפש) is commonly attributed to Rabbi Elazar, who first published it in his Sefer Haredim.

References

External links
 Biography - from the Orthodox Union
 Sefer Hareidim (Venice) – free scanned version in DjVu format
  Traditional Sephardi Singing of Yedid Nefesh

1533 births
1600 deaths
Rabbis in Safed
Jewish poets
Hebrew-language writers
16th-century rabbis from the Ottoman Empire
Kabbalists
Rabbis in Ottoman Galilee
Sephardi rabbis
Sephardi Jews in Ottoman Palestine